Kul Tigin (Pinyin: Quètèqín, Wade-Giles: chüeh-t'e-ch'in, AD 684–731) was a general and a prince of the Second Turkic Khaganate.

Etymology 
Necip Asım (1921) for the first time did read his name as köl, based on the etymology of Mahmud al-Kashgari, meaning "lake, sea". Radloff did read this word as kül, and Thomsen (1896), Malov (1951) and Tekin (1968) adopted this reading. Bazin (1956) and Hamilton (1962) rejected Radloff's reading and preferred the form köl. However, Chinese sources used the Chinese character 闕 (què). Therefore, this word should be read as kül, not köl.

Early years 
He was a second son of Ilterish Qaghan, the Second Turkic Khaganate's founder, and the younger brother of Bilge Kaghan, the fourth kaghan. He was seven when his father died.

During the reign of Qapagan Khaghan, Kul Tigin and his older brother earned reputation for their military prowess. They defeated Yenisei Kirghiz, Turgesh, and the Karluks, extending the Kaganate territory all the way to the Iron Gate south of Samarkand. They also subjugated all nine of the Tokuz Oguz tribes.

In 705, Tujue forces commanded by Mojilian entered Lingwu, defeating Shazha Chongyi (沙吒忠义). Kul Tigin commanded a unit in battle, in which he lost three horses.

In 711, he participated in Battle of Bolchu, which was disastrous for Turgesh.

In 713 he participated in subjugation of Karluk tribes with his brother and uncle.

As supreme commander 
Upon the death of Qapagan Khaghan, his son Inel Qaghan attempted to illegally ascend to the throne, defying the traditional Lateral succession law, but Kül Tigin refused to recognize the takeover. He raised an army, attacked, and killed Inel, Ashina Duoxifu and his trusted followers. He placed his elder brother Bilge Khagan on the throne, and took the title of Shad, an equivalent of commander-in-chief of the army, for himself.

Death 

He died suddenly on 27 February 731. A stele in memory of Kül Tigin, which included inscriptions in both Turkic and Chinese, was erected at his memorial complex of Khoshoo Tsaidam, at the present site of the Orkhon inscriptions. Kül-Tegin is also mentioned in the inscription erected in memory of his older brother Bilge Qaghan at the neighbouring site of Khöshöö-Tsaidam-1.

His burial ceremony took place in 1 November 731. He was posthumously renamed Inanču Apa Yarğan Tarqan by Bilge Khagan.

The head of the Kül Tigin sculpture in the Khöshöö-Tsaidam enclave in (Orkhon, in northern Mongolia) carries a bird with wings spread like an eagle, personifying a raven. The head was found by the Czech archeologie Lumir Jisl during his 1957-1958 expedition to Mongolia.

Popular culture 
He was portrayed by Ham Suk Hun (함석훈) in Korean TV Series Dae Jo Yeong.

Notes

References

Sources 
Talat Tekin, A Grammar of Orkhon Turkic. Indiana University Uralic and Altaic Series, vol. 69 (Bloomington/The Hague: Mouton, 1968)
新疆维吾尔自治区民族事务委員会、新疆民族辞典， 乌鲁木齐：新疆人民出版社，1995 [Xinjiang Uygur Autonomous District Minority People's Committee, Encyclopedic Dictionary of the Xinjiang Minority Peoples, Ürümqi: Xinjiang People's Publishing Company, 1955]

External links
The National Museum of Mongolian History
Kül Tiğin Inscriptions complete text (archived)
Orkhon inscriptions with translations (contains Kül Tiğin inscriptions with translations, archived)

685 births
730s deaths
Göktürk khagans
Ashina house of the Turkic Empire
8th-century Turkic people